Joseph Newton (born 23 January 1950) is a Barbadian cricketer. He played in two first-class and three List A matches for the Barbados cricket team in 1975/76 and 1976/77.

See also
 List of Barbadian representative cricketers

References

External links
 

1950 births
Living people
Barbadian cricketers
Barbados cricketers
People from Christ Church, Barbados